Monesple is a commune in the Ariège department in southwestern France.

Geography
The Lèze forms the commune's southwestern border.

Population

See also
Communes of the Ariège department

References

Communes of Ariège (department)
Ariège communes articles needing translation from French Wikipedia